Clostridium ramosum is an anaerobic, non-motile, thin, spore-forming, gram-positive bacterium that is among the gut flora of humans.

Research 
The bacterium has a possible obesogenic potential but the underlying mechanism of this observed effect in mice are unclear. It is suggested that this microbe under a high-fat diet helps to reinforce the sugar and fat absorption. The associated higher intake of energy-supplying nutrients makes the fat grow faster - a factor of obesity.

See also 
 Human microbiome

References

External links 
 Identification of Clostridium Species and DNA Fingerprinting of Clostridium perfringens by Amplified Fragment Length Polymorphism Analysis (2006)
 Type strain of Clostridium ramosum at BacDive -  the Bacterial Diversity Metadatabase

Gram-positive bacteria
Gut flora bacteria
ramosum
Bacteria described in 1898